Malene Helgø (born 26 August 1999) is a Norwegian tennis player.

She has a career-high singles ranking of No. 318, achieved on 9 January 2023. Her best doubles ranking is 347, achieved on 14 November 2022.
Helgø has won five singles and seven doubles titles on the ITF Circuit.

She represented Norway at the 2023 United Cup as the No. 1 female player.

Playing for Norway in Billie Jean King Cup, Helgø has a win–loss record of 21–10.

On the ITF Junior Circuit, Helgø has been ranked as high as No. 29 in the world.

Junior career

Grand Slam tournament performance
Singles:
 Australian Open: 1R (2017)
 French Open: 1R (2016)
 Wimbledon: 1R (2016)
 US Open: 2R (2016)

Doubles:
 Australian Open: QF (2017)
 French Open: 1R (2016)
 Wimbledon: QF (2016)
 US Open: 2R (2016)

ITF Circuit finals

Singles: 9 (5 titles, 4 runner–up)

Doubles: 15 (7 titles, 8 runner–ups)

Billie Jean King Cup participation

Singles: 16 (11–5)

Doubles: 15 (10–5)

United Cup (0–2)

Notes

References

External links
 
 
 

1999 births
Living people
Sportspeople from Oslo
Norwegian female tennis players
21st-century Norwegian women